Geórgios Papadopoulos (5 May 1919 – 27 June 1999) was a Greek military officer and political leader who ruled Greece after a coup from 1967 to 1973. He joined the Royal Hellenic Army during the Second World War and resisted the 1940 Italian invasion. Where he achieved with honors and became a hero. He remained in the army after the war and rose to the rank of colonel. In April 1967, Papadopoulos and a group of other mid-level army officers overthrew the democratic government and established a military junta that lasted until 1974. Assuming dictatorial powers, he led an authoritarian, anti-communist and ultranationalist regime which eventually ended the Greek monarchy and established a republic, with himself as president. In 1973, he was overthrown and arrested by his co-conspirator, Brigadier General Dimitrios Ioannidis. After the Metapolitefsi which restored democracy in 1974, Papadopoulos was for his part in the crimes of the junta and sentenced to death, but pardoned. Refusing several offers of clemency in exchange for admitting guilt for the crimes of the junta, he spent the remainder of his life in prison.

Early life and military career 

Papadopoulos was born in Elaiohori, a small village in the Prefecture of Achaea in Peloponnese to local schoolteacher Christos Papadopoulos and his wife Chrysoula. He was the eldest son and had two brothers, Konstantinos and Haralambos. After finishing high school in 1937, he enrolled in the Royal Hellenic Military Academy, completing its three-year programme in 1940.

His biographical notes, published as a booklet by his supporters in 1980, mention that he took a civil engineering course at the Polytechneion but did not graduate.

Resistance and acquiescence 
During the Second World War, Papadopoulos saw field action as an artillery second lieutenant against both Italian and Nazi German forces which attacked Greece on 6 April 1941. 

It has been argued by various authors that Papadopoulos was a member of the Security Battalions under the command of Colonel Kourkoulakos, who was responsible for the formation of the "Security Battalions" in Patras which "hunted down" Greek resistance fighters. However, Evanthis Hatzivassiliou and Leonidas F. Kallivretakis disagree with this claim. It has also been argued that Papadopoulos, at the end of the Axis occupation of Greece, entered the Organisation X, but Calivratakis considers that this information has not been proven. According to Kallivretakis and Grigoriadis, during the Axis occupation of Greece, Papadopoulos worked in the Greek administration’s Patras. 

Along with other right-wing military officers, he participated in the creation of the nationalist right-wing secret IDEA organisation in the autumn of 1944, shortly after the country's liberation. Those 1940 officers who took refuge in the Kingdom of Egypt along with King Geórgios II immediately after the German invasion, had become generals when their still-colonel former classmates undertook the coup of 1967.

Post-Second World War career 
He was promoted to captain in 1946; and in 1949, during the Greek Civil War, to major. (See also Greek military ranks.) He served in the KYP Intelligence Service from 1959 to 1964 as the main contact between the KYP and the top CIA operative in Greece, John Fatseas, after training at the CIA in 1953.

Trials and tribulations: The Beloyannis affair 

Major Papadopoulos, as he then was, was also a member of the court-martial in the first trial of the well-known Greek communist leader Nikos Beloyannis, in 1951. At that trial, Beloyannis was sentenced to death for the crime of being a member of the Communist Party of Greece (KKE), which was banned at that time in Greece following the Greek Civil War. The death sentence pronounced after this trial  was not carried out, but Beloyannis was put on trial again in early 1952, this time for alleged espionage, following the discovery of radio transmitters used by undercover Greek communists to communicate with the exiled leadership of the Party in the Soviet Union. At the end of this trial, he was sentenced to death and immediately taken out and shot. Papadopoulos was not involved in this second trial. The Beloyannis trials were highly controversial in Greece, and many Greeks consider that, like many Greek communists at the time, Beloyannis was shot for his political beliefs, rather than any real crimes. The trial was by military court-martial under Greek anti-insurgency legislation enacted at the time of the Greek Civil War, which remained in force even though the war had ended.

Rise to colonel in the 1960s 
In 1956, Papadopoulos took part in a failed coup attempt against King Pávlos. In 1958, he helped create the Office of Military Studies, a surveillance authority, under General Gogousis. It was from this same office that the subsequently successful coup of 21 April 1967 emanated.

In 1964, Papadopoulos was transferred to an artillery division in Western Thrace by a decree of Defense Minister Garoufalias, a member of the Centre Union (EK). In June 1965, days before the onset of the major political turmoil known as Apostasia, he made national headlines after arresting two soldiers under his command and eight leftist civilians from settlements near his military camp, on charges that they had conspired to sabotage army vehicles by pouring sugar into the vehicles' petrol tanks. The ten were imprisoned and tortured, but it was eventually proven that Papadopoulos himself had sabotaged the vehicles. Andreas Papandreou wrote in his memoirs that Papadopoulos wanted to prove that under the Centre Union (EK) government, the Communists had been left free to undermine national security. Even after this scandal, Papadopoulos was not discharged from the army since the Prime Minister, Geórgios Papandreou, forgave him as a compatriot of his father.
In 1967, Papadopoulos was promoted to colonel.

21 April 1967: Coup d'état 

That same year, on 21 April, a month before the general elections, Colonel Papadopoulos, along with fellow middle-ranking Army officers, led a successful coup, taking advantage of the volatile political situation that had arisen from a conflict between the young King Constantine II and the popular former Prime Minister, Geórgios Papandreou. Papadopoulos used his power gained from the coup to try to place Papandreou under house arrest and re-engineer the Greek political landscape rightward. Papadopoulos, along with the other junta members, are known in Greece by the term Aprilianoi ('Aprilians'), denoting the month of the coup. The term Aprilianoi has become synonymous with the term "dictators of 1967 – 1974".

Regime of the Colonels 

King Constantine appointed a new government nominally headed by Konstantinos Kollias.  However, from the early stages, Papadopoulos was the strongman of the new regime. He was appointed Minister of National Defense and Minister of the Presidency in the Kollias government, and his position was further enhanced after the King's abortive counter-coup on 13 December, when Papadopoulos replaced Kollias as Prime Minister. Not content with that, on 21 March 1972, he nominated himself Regent of Greece, succeeding General Geórgios Zoitakis.

Torture of political prisoners in general, and communists in particular, was not out of the question. Examples included severe beatings, isolation and, according to some sources, pulling out fingernails.

"Patient in a cast" and other metaphors 
Throughout his tenure as the junta strongman, Papadopoulos often employed what have been described by the BBC as gory surgical metaphors, where he or the junta assumed the role of the "medical doctor". The "patient" was Greece. Typically, Papadopoulos or the junta portrayed themselves as the "doctor" who operated on the "patient" by putting the patient's "foot" in an orthopedic cast and applying restraints on the "patient", tying him on a surgical bed and putting him under anesthesia to perform the "operation" so that the life of the "patient" would not be "endangered" during the operation. In one of his famous speeches, Papadopoulos mentioned:   Translated as:
 
In the same speech Papadopoulos continued:  
which translates as follows:

Other metaphors contained religious imagery related to the resurrection of Christ at Easter: "Χριστός Ανέστη – Ελλάς Ανέστη" translating as "Christ has risen – Greece has risen", alluding that the junta would "save" Greece and resurrect her into a greater, new Land. The theme of rebirth was used many times as a standard reply to avoid answering any questions as to how long the dictatorship would last:
Translated as:

The religious themes and rebirth metaphors are also seen in the following:

Translated as:

Assassination attempt 

A failed assassination attempt against Papadopoulos was perpetrated by Alexandros Panagoulis in the morning of 13 August 1968, when Papadopoulos was driven from his summer residence in Lagonisi to Athens, escorted by his personal security motorcycles and cars. Panagoulis ignited a bomb at a point of the coastal road where the limousine carrying Papadopoulos would have to slow down, but the bomb failed to harm Papadopoulos. Panagoulis was captured a few hours later in a nearby sea cave, since the boat sent to help him escape was instructed to leave at a specific time and he couldn't swim there on time due to strong sea currents.  After his arrest, he was taken to the Greek Military Police (EAT-ESA) offices where he was questioned, beaten and tortured. On 17 November 1968, Panagoulis was sentenced to death but was personally pardoned by Papadopoulos, served only five years in prison, and after democracy was restored was elected a member of Parliament. He was regarded as an emblematic figure of the struggle to restore democracy, and as such has often been paralleled to Harmodius and Aristogeiton, two ancient Athenians known for their assassination of Hipparchus, brother of the tyrant Hippias.

Normalisation and attempts at liberalisation 

Papadopoulos had indicated as early as 1968 that he was eager for a reform process, and even tried to contact Spiros Markezinis at that time. He had declared at the time that he did not want the Revolution of 21 April to become a 'regime'. Several attempts to liberalise the regime during 1969 and 1970 were thwarted by the hardliners on the junta, including Ioannides. In fact, subsequent to his 1970 failed attempt at reform, he threatened to resign and was dissuaded only after the hardliners renewed their personal allegiance to him.

As internal dissatisfaction grew in the early 1970s, and especially after an abortive coup by the Navy in early 1973, Papadopoulos attempted to legitimise the regime by beginning a gradual "democratisation" (see also the article on the Metapolitefsi). On 1 June 1973, he abolished the monarchy and declared Greece a republic with himself as president.  He was confirmed in office via a controversial referendum. He furthermore sought the support of the old political establishment, but secured only the cooperation of Spiros Markezinis, who became Prime Minister. Concurrently, many restrictions were lifted and the army's role significantly reduced. An interim constitution created a presidential republic, which vested sweeping—almost dictatorial—powers in the hands of the president. The decision to return to (at least nominal) civilian rule and the restriction of the army's role was resented by many of the regime's supporters, whose dissatisfaction with Papadopoulos would become evident a few months later.

Denial of CIA involvement

Various sources have claimed Papadopoulos underwent military and intelligence training in the United States during the 1950s, or that he had connections to the CIA.

On 1 July 1973, The Observer published an article by Charles Foley claiming that the Central Intelligence Agency (CIA) had engineered the coup and that unnamed senior officials in the Joint United States Military Aid Assistance Group in Athens regarded Papadopoulos as "the first CIA agent to become Premier of a European country". The source for much of Foley's story was Andreas Papandreou, the Minister of State in Charge of Intelligence in the government overthrown by Papadopoulos. The following day, during William Colby's confirmation hearings to be Director of Central Intelligence, Colby was asked by Stuart Symington, chairman of the United States Senate Committee on Armed Services, if there was any justification for the assertions. Colby replied that he had the allegations researched and found that the CIA had not 'engineered' the coup, Papadopoulos was not an 'Agent' of the CIA, and that Papadopoulos was never 'paid' by the CIA. Colby added "[Papadopoulos] has been an official of the Greek Government at various times, and in those periods from time to time we worked with him in his official capacity." A clarifying statement was added to the record: "The only association the Agency ever had with Papadopoulos of any kind was in his capacity as an officer of the Greek Intelligence Service, with which we have maintained a liaison relationship since the Greek civil war in the late 1940s."

John M. Maury, who was the CIA's Chief of Station in Athens, stated in 1977 that "considerable speculation arose throughout Athens and in the American embassy about the possibility that the Greek military, basically rightist and pro-NATO, might intervene to thwart the election or, if the Center Union party won, prevent the Papandreous from assuming power" and that "some embassy staffers suggested the possibility of a covert CIA operation to encourage the candidacy of moderate pro-Western elements to strengthen the anti-Papandreou forces at the polls". Maury stated that "a modest covert program to support moderate candidates in a few 'swing' districts" was considered by the United States National Security Council, but rejected for fear of irreparably damaging Greece–United States relations and because "the time had come for the Greeks to take care of themselves". According to Maury, Operation Prometheus caught everyone, including the Americans, by surprise. Maury added that he "had met some of [the brigadiers and colonels left in control after the coup], including George Papadopoulos, who was to head the junta, casually when they were middle-grade officers in KYP, the intelligence service with which CIA had working-level liaison on matters of common concern, as with the intelligence services of all NATO countries." He described them as "right-wing fanatics" who had no "close connection with the Americans or experience in foreign policy or political activity."

A detailed study by Alexis Papachelas found evidence that Andreas Papandreou's claim of U.S. involvement "is wildly at variance with the facts": U.S. officials had contemplated but rejected using the CIA to weaken the leftist flank of the Centre Union Party associated with Andreas, eventually determining that a prospective Centre Union government under Geórgios Papandreou would not pave the way for a takeover by Greek communists. As late as 20 April 1967, the U.S. embassy was instructed to pressure King Constantine II "to accept the popular will and keep the army in its barracks." U.S. officials were stunned by the coup on 21 April because, while aware of coup plotting within Greek military circles, they never expected Greek officers to act independently of the monarchy.

Divorce by decree 

Papadopoulos married his first wife, Niki Vasileiadi, in 1941.  They had two children, a son and a daughter. The marriage, however, ran into difficulty later and they eventually separated. The separation, however lengthy, could not lead to divorce at first because, under Greece's restrictive divorce laws of that era, spousal consent was required. To remedy this, in 1970, as Prime Minister of the dictatorship, he decreed a custom-made divorce law with a strict time limit (and a built-in sunset clause) that enabled him to get the divorce. After having served its purpose, the law eventually expired automatically. After the divorce, Papadopoulos married his long-time paramour Despina Gaspari in 1970, with whom he had a daughter.

Fall of the Papadopoulos regime 
After the events of the student uprising of 17 November at the National Technical University of Athens (see Athens Polytechnic uprising), the dictatorship was overthrown on 25 November 1973 by hardline elements in the Army. The outcry over Papadopoulos's extensive reliance on the army to quell the student uprising gave Brigadier Dimitrios Ioannidis a pretext to oust him and replace him as the new strongman of the regime. Papadopoulos was put under house arrest at his villa, while Greece returned to an "orthodox" military dictatorship.

After democracy was restored in 1974, during the period of Metapolitefsi ("regime change"), Papadopoulos and his cohorts were arrested and were eventually put on trial for high treason, mutiny, torture, and other crimes and misdemeanors.

On 23 August 1975, he and several others were found guilty and were sentenced to death, which was later commuted to life imprisonment. Papadopoulos remained in prison, rejecting an amnesty offer that required that he acknowledge his past record and express remorse, until his death on 27 June 1999 at age 80 in a hospital in Athens, where he had been treated for cancer since 1996.

Legacy 
Today, Papadopoulos is a symbol of authoritarianism and xenophobia. The far right praises him for promoting Greek culture, arresting political enemies, and fighting democracy. After the restoration of democracy, some support for his type of politics remained which was, for a time, bolstered by the National Political Union (EPEN), a small political party that declared him its honorary leader. The EPEN eventually dissolved, with supporters scattering to various other political parties such as the Popular Orthodox Rally (LAOS) and criminal organisations like Golden Dawn (XA).

See also 
 History of Modern Greece
 Military history of Greece during World War II

Notes

References

External links

|-

|-

1919 births
1999 deaths
20th-century presidents of Greece
20th-century regents of Greece
20th-century prime ministers of Greece
Presidents of Greece
Prime Ministers of Greece
Leaders of the Greek junta
Leaders who took power by coup
People from Achaea
People convicted of treason against Greece
Greek criminals
Greek fascists
Greek collaborators with Nazi Germany
Greek anti-communists
Greek nationalists
Greek military personnel of World War II
Greek military personnel of the Greek Civil War
Greek colonels
Hellenic Army officers
Government ministers of Greece
Ministers of National Defence of Greece
Regents of Greece
Deaths from cancer in Greece
Burials at the First Cemetery of Athens
1960s in Greek politics
1970s in Greek politics
Heads of government who were later imprisoned
Prisoners sentenced to death by Greece